Paek Won-chul (born 10 January 1977) is a Korean handball player who competed in the 2000 Summer Olympics, in the 2004 Summer Olympics, in the 2008 Summer Olympics and in the 2012 Summer Olympics.

References

1977 births
Living people
South Korean male handball players
Olympic handball players of South Korea
Handball players at the 2000 Summer Olympics
Handball players at the 2004 Summer Olympics
Handball players at the 2008 Summer Olympics
Handball players at the 2012 Summer Olympics
Korea National Sport University alumni
Sportspeople from Gyeonggi Province
Asian Games medalists in handball
Handball players at the 1998 Asian Games
Handball players at the 2002 Asian Games
Handball players at the 2006 Asian Games
Handball players at the 2010 Asian Games
Asian Games gold medalists for South Korea
Medalists at the 1998 Asian Games
Medalists at the 2002 Asian Games
Medalists at the 2010 Asian Games